JIBS may stand for:

 Journal of International Business Studies
 Jonkoping International Business School, Sweden
 Jeju Free International City Broadcasting System, or JIBS, a South Korean radio and TV station

See also
Jib (disambiguation)